Palmitoyltransferase ZDHHC9 is an enzyme that in humans is encoded by the ZDHHC9 gene that contains a DHHC domain.

References

Further reading